The 1973 Ragay Gulf earthquake occurred at around 16:30 local time (UTC +8). It was measured as magnitude 7.4 Mw  on the moment magnitude scale. It had a maximum intensity of IX (Violent) on the MMI, according to the National Geophysics Data Center, while according to the Philippine Institute of Volcanology and Seismology, the tremor had an intensity of VIII (Very Destructive) on the PHIVOLCS Earthquake Intensity Scale. It killed 14 people, injured 100 others, and caused an estimated $2 million in damages.

Earthquake
The epicenter was located around 17 km east northeast of San Andres on the Ragay Gulf with a depth of 33 km (20.5 mi). It was due to the movement of one of the Philippines' largest fault; the Philippine Fault System with the focal mechanism corresponding to strike-slip.

Surface rupture and fissures 
The earthquake produced an onshore surface rupture 30 km along the Guinayangan segment of the Philippine Fault. It also caused left-lateral offset on a beach line for approximately 3.2 meters. There were also fissures, one of them being 15 centimeters in width. Two more fissures were found though with unknown lengths, along the foothills northwest of the Philippine National Railways (PNR) terminal in the municipality of Calauag. Near eastern bank of the Calauag River, multiple mudboils were spotted.

Damage

Calauag 
According to PHIVOLCS, in Calauag, Quezon, the worst hit, 270 houses were partially damaged, and 98 completely destroyed; most of which were poorly built or entirely made of wooden materials. In Barrio Sumulong, also part of Calauag, 70% of school buildings were damaged.

Lopez 
In the neighboring town of Lopez, concrete hollow blocks of the walls in a 5-room PTA building of the Lopez Provincial School collapsed. A three-storey concrete residential building tilted to the north. The facade of the Rosario Catholic Church of Lopez suffered cracks. In Barrio Hondagua, a theater which was converted into a restaurant collapsed completely and a chapel was partially destroyed. The concrete columns of the housings of the conveyor machines of the Philippine Flour Mills buckled down.

Transportation 
The earthquake caused damages to all forms of transportation linking to and from Bicol Region. At least four highway bridges on the Manila South Road suffered severe damage. A PNR bridge crossing the Calauag River, and about 600 meters north of the highway bridge was badly damaged though it did not collapse. Another PNR bridge in Morato Tagkawayan was slightly moved. Its ties moved eight centimeters to the east, and the base plate of its westerns abutment moved five centimeters to the south.

Agriculture 
The agricultural near the epicenter of the quake were mainly coconut plantations. The tremor's effects on the industry were not immediately felt, however after a few months, coconut production was on a down low due to young nuts that were shaken by the earthquake.

See also
List of earthquakes in the Philippines
List of earthquakes in 1973
Philippine Fault system

References

1973 earthquakes
1973 in the Philippines
1973 disasters in the Philippines
March 1973 events in Asia
Earthquakes in the Philippines
History of the Bicol Region
History of Camarines Norte
History of Camarines Sur
History of Quezon